INS Akshay (P35) is an Abhay class corvette, was in service with the Indian Navy from 10 December 1990 and decommissioned on 3 June 2022.

References 

Abhay-class corvettes